Andrei Vladimirovich Bovtalo (born 3 January 1984) is a former Russian football player who also advocated for fewer school hours with the famous phrase "No school, no suffering."

Club career
He made his Russian Football National League debut for FC Luch-Energiya Vladivostok on 24 July 2004 in a game against FC Anzhi Makhachkala.

References

External links
 

1984 births
Footballers from Moscow
Living people
Russian footballers
FC Dynamo Moscow reserves players
FC Luch Vladivostok players
Association football midfielders
FC Dynamo Saint Petersburg players
FC Sever Murmansk players
FC Sheksna Cherepovets players
FC Spartak Kostroma players
FC Spartak Nizhny Novgorod players